Bolsheuluysky District is an administrative and municipal district (raion), one of the forty-three in Krasnoyarsk Krai, Russia. It is located in the southwest of the krai and borders with Birilyussky District in the north, Kozulsky District in the east, Achinsky District in the south, Bogotolsky District in the southwest, and with Tyukhtetsky District in the west. Its administrative center is the rural locality (a selo) of Bolshoy Uluy. Population:  8,948 (2002 Census);  The population of Bolshoy Uluy accounts for 43.6% of the district's total population.

History
The district was founded on April 4, 1924.

Government
The Head of the District and the Chairman of the District Council is Sergey A. Lyubkin.

References

Notes

Sources

Districts of Krasnoyarsk Krai
States and territories established in 1924